A conference is a meeting of two or more experts to discuss and exchange opinions or new information about a particular topic. 

Conferences can be used as a form of group decision-making, although discussion, not always decisions, are the main purpose of conferences.

History 
The first known use of "conference" appears in 1527, meaning "a meeting of two or more persons for discussing matters of common concern". It came from the word "confer", which means "to compare views or take counsel". 
However the idea of a conference far predates the word. Arguably, as long as there have been people, there have been meetings and discussions between people. Evidence of ancient forms of conference can be seen in archaeological ruins of common areas where people would gather to discuss shared interests such as "hunting plans, wartime activities, negotiations for peace or the organisation of tribal celebrations". 

Since the 1960s, conferences have become a lucrative sector of the tourism industry and have evolved into hundred billion Pound per year industry on a global scale. The growth around the world, including in Great Britain, Germany, Philippines, United States and Australia, has led to conferences themselves becoming an industry with buyers, suppliers, marketing, branding and conference facilities. 

Modern conferences can be held to discuss a variety of topics, from politics, to science or sport. Many conferences are held on a regular periodic basis, such as annually, biannually (twice per year), or biennially (every other year).

With the development of communications technology, conference holders have the choice of replacing the physical meeting space with a telephonic or virtual form of meeting. This has resulted in terms such as a conference call or video conference.

Conference types 
Conferences can have various formats, topics and intentions.

Conference formats 
 Conference call, in telecommunications, a call with more than two participants at the same time
 Conference hall, room where conferences are held
 Video conference, with the reception and transmission of audio-video signals by users at different locations

Conferences topics 
 Academic conference, in science and academic, a formal event where researchers present results, workshops, and other activities
 Annual conferences within Methodism, the governing structure of certain Methodist churches; despite the name, these are not individual events
 Athletic conference, a competitive grouping of teams, often geographical
 Authors' conference, or writers' conference, where writers gather to review their written works and suggest improvements
 Parent–teacher conference, a meeting with a child's teacher to discuss grades and school performance
 Peace conference, a diplomatic meeting to end conflict
 Press conference, an announcement to the press (print, radio, television) with the expectation of questions, about the announced matter
 Professional conference, a meeting of professionals in a given subject or profession dealing with related matters or developments
 Settlement conference, a meeting between the plaintiff and the respondent in a lawsuit, wherein they try to settle their dispute without proceeding to trial
 Trade fair, or trade conference
 Unconference or open space conference, a participant-driven meeting that tries to avoid one or more aspects of a conventional conference

See also
 Conference pear, a fruit, a cultivar of European pear
 Conference call, a telephonic meeting

 TED (Technology, Education and Design) Talks and TEDx conferences 
 List of Allied World War II conferences
 Summit (meeting)
 Symposium (disambiguation)
 Convention

References 

Broad-concept articles
 
Meetings
Social events